KUMU-FM (94.7 MHz) - branded as 94.7 KUMU (pronounced koo-moo) - is a commercial radio station in Honolulu, Hawaii.   It airs a rhythmic adult contemporary radio format and is owned by Pacific Radio Group, Inc.  The studios and offices are on Bishop Street in Downtown Honolulu.

The transmitter is on the Hilton Hawaiian Village Hotel, on Kalia Road in Waikiki.  KUMU-FM has an effective radiated power (ERP) of 100,000 watts.  The station also transmits on Oceanic Time Warner Cable digital channel 870 for the entire state of Hawaii.

History

The station signed on the air on June 30, 1967, as KFOA.  It was owned by the Royal Hawaiian Radio Company, and originally had an effective radiated power of 30,000 watts, less than a third of its current output.  The studios and transmitter were located at the Hilton Hawaiian Village.

In 1971, KFOA was acquired by the John Hutton Corporation, which also owned AM station KUMU (now KHKA).  The station became KUMU-FM, airing a beautiful music format, also found on KUMU 1500.  The two stations enjoyed high ratings for several decades, but in the 1990s, the easy listening format began to age, while most advertisers seek young to middle aged clients.  KUMU-AM-FM would add more vocals and scaled back the instrumentals.

In 1997, KUMU-AM-FM were bought by Pacific West Broadcasting for $2.8 million.  KUMU-FM shifted to soft adult contemporary music and its AM sister station began its own programming.

By 2010, KUMU's direction transitioned to rhythmic adult contemporary music as "Hawaii's Old Skool" (later replaced with "The Rhythm of Hawaii" in 2014).  KUMU added a nightly "Quiet Storm" show featuring Rico, which replaced the syndicated "Delilah" program. In addition, its AM sister station once again became a simulcast for the FM station before changing its format and call sign in September 2010 following the sale of the AM station.

KUMU-FM is usually among the top five stations in the Honolulu Nielsen ratings.

References

External links
KUMU-FM official website

UMU-FM
Rhythmic adult contemporary radio stations
Radio stations established in 1967
1967 establishments in Hawaii